The 1955 Australian federal election was held in Australia on 10 December 1955. All 122 seats in the House of Representatives and 30 of the 60 seats in the Senate were up for election. An early election was called to bring the House and Senate elections back in line; the previous election in 1954 had been House-only. The incumbent Liberal–Country coalition led by Prime Minister Robert Menzies increased its majority over the opposition Labor Party, led by H. V. Evatt.

Future Prime Minister Malcolm Fraser and future opposition leader Billy Snedden both entered parliament at this election.

Results

House of Representatives

 Ten members were elected unopposed – five Liberal and five Country. This would be the last federal election where any seat attracted only one candidate.

Senate

Seats changing hands

 Bob Joshua contested his seat as a candidate for the Australian Labor Party (Anti-Communist).

See also
 Candidates of the Australian federal election, 1955
 Members of the Australian House of Representatives, 1955–1958
 Members of the Australian Senate, 1956–1959

Notes

References
University of WA  election results in Australia since 1890
AEC 2PP vote
Prior to 1984 the AEC did not undertake a full distribution of preferences for statistical purposes. The stored ballot papers for the 1983 election were put through this process prior to their destruction. Therefore, the figures from 1983 onwards show the actual result based on full distribution of preferences.

Federal elections in Australia
1955 elections in Australia
December 1955 events in Australia